Kanaphan Puitrakul (also known as First, born 3 September 1998) is a Thai actor. He is best known for his roles in Wake Up Ladies: The Series, Blacklist, The Shipper, Not Me, and The Eclipse the Series.

Early life and education 
Kanaphan was born in Bangkok, Thailand. He completed his secondary education in Suankularb Wittayalai School. He is currently taking up a bachelor's degree in social communication innovation under the College of Social Communication Innovation of Srinakharinwirot University.

Career 
He started his acting career after auditioning from a pool of 100 teenagers and got the main role for The Assassin: ฆาตกร, a movie produced for Children's Day in 2016. In 2017, he participated in the "Cool Man Good Man" competition where he placed fourth and became part of KAZZ Magazine's photo shoot in November 2017. He was then tapped by KA Cosmetics, together with Poompat Iam-samang (Up), for a yaoi television advertisement which later on became viral. He became part of Wake Up Ladies: The Series in 2018 where he played a support role as Ryu. In 2019, he was given a main role as Ryo in Wolf and as Jim Bae in Blacklist.
He is also known for his role as Akk in GMMTV's The Eclipse the Series and is currently part of the channel's official pairing "FirstKhaotung."

Filmography

Film

Television

References

External links 
 
 

1998 births
Living people
Kanaphan Puitrakul
Kanaphan Puitrakul
Kanaphan Puitrakul
Kanaphan Puitrakul
Kanaphan Puitrakul